Khathar daro کٿڙ دڙو is a village and deh in Shaheed Fazil Rahu taluka of Badin District, Sindh. As of 2017, it has a population of 2,790, in 546 households. It is part of the tapedar circle of Jhol-1.

References 

Populated places in Badin District